Nanny and the Professor is an early 1970s American  sitcom created by AJ Carothers and Thomas L. Miller for 20th Century-Fox Television that aired on ABC from January 21, 1970 until
December 27, 1971. During pre-production, the proposed title was Nanny Will Do.

Premise

Playing upon the popularity of Mary Poppins and other magical nannies of literature, this TV series posited another ostensibly magical British nanny taking care of a family in need of guidance. Unlike the candid "magicality" of its forebears, this Nanny's paranormal nature was less overt and only implied. The Nanny's young wards, and the audience, were left intentionally uncertain of the nature of Nanny's "powers", if any.

The series starred Juliet Mills as Nanny Phoebe Figalilly, Richard Long as Professor Harold Everett, and in season 3 Elsa Lanchester in the recurring role of Aunt Henrietta.  Figalilly was housekeeper for Professor Everett and nanny to his three children: Hal, the intellectual tinkerer, played by David Doremus; Butch, the middle child, played by Trent Lehman; and Prudence, the youngest, played by Kim Richards.

Nanny was apparently psychic, and had regular flashes of what was often more than intuition (accented by a musical tinkling sound effect); she frequently knew who was at the door before the doorbell even rang.  There was the vague suggestion that she may have been at least several hundred years old and more than human, which the children thought they discovered in an episode after they saw a photo of Phoebe that looked like it was taken a century earlier.  On outings, Nanny wore a navy blue Inverness cape and cap that resembled a deerstalker; the program's opening titles showed animations of both.  Midway through the first season Nanny and the kids restored a broken down 1930 Model A Ford, which Nanny named "Arabella". For some reason the car's radio can only pick up radio broadcasts from 1930.

The location of the series remained unclear; in season 1 pilot episode, and the season 2 episode "The Art of Relationships", it is mentioned that Everett is a professor at Collier University, but at the time there was no known college bearing that name.

Following the show's cancellation, two animated adaptations of the series (Nanny and the Professor and Nanny and the Professor and the Phantom of the Circus) aired as part of The ABC Saturday Superstar Movie. Members of the original cast provided voices for their respective characters.

Main cast
"Nanny" Phoebe Figalilly (Juliet Mills), a beautiful young British woman who shows up unannounced at the Everett household to look after the Professor's children.  Though she gives no references, Everett affords Phoebe the customary six-week probationary period to see what she can do. At first her antics seem strange to the family, especially Hal, who calls her a "weirdo", but she soon endears herself to the three kids and, to a lesser extent, Everett himself.  Phoebe (who prefers to be called "Nanny") claims to be neither clairvoyant nor magical, but appears to have a sixth sense about many things (accented by a tinkling musical sound whenever her senses assert themselves), including knowing the names of people she has never met, communicating with animals, and especially knowing someone is at the front door or on the telephone before they ring the bell.
Professor Harold Everett (Richard Long), a widower and mathematics teacher at Collier University.  Everett's three children are so rambunctious that he cannot retain a nanny to take care of them; In the first episode they have gone through five different au pairs in less than a year before Nanny's arrival.  Though he admits Nanny is already doing a very good job, his skepticism and Nanny's lack of references maintain his doubts as to whether it will work out, added to which the sheer implausibility of the many strange things that have happened since Nanny's arrival contradict Everett's discipline of practicality.  Initially he spends most of his time working, but with Nanny's subtle prompting he begins to spend more and more time with his family.  As the series progressed there were increasingly prevalent hints of a romantic interest between Everett and Nanny.
Harold "Hal" Everett, Jr. (David Doremus), the oldest of the Everett kids, Hal is of above average intelligence and takes after his father's practical and skeptical persona; the two often play chess together.  Hal is also a tinkerer and inventor, though his experiments often go awry; one of his inventions is a prototype of what would later become known as The Clapper.
Bentley "Butch" Everett (Trent Lehman),  the middle child and Hal's younger brother, who hates his real name and, when he's not eating, enjoys sports and is an occasional prankster; he unsuccessfully attempts to frighten Nanny by hiding his pet guinea pig in her bag.  Butch harbors jealousy and envy of Hal and has a penchant for following in his footsteps whenever Hal takes up a new career choice, though in one episode the tables are briefly turned when, after he mimics Hal's stargazing, he happens to find a new comet and the Bureau of Astronomics decide to name the comet after him.  
Prudence Everett (Kim Richards), the youngest of the Everett kids and the Professor's only daughter.  Prudence immediately takes a liking to Nanny when she first arrives.
Mrs. Fowler (Patsy Garrett) (recurring), the Everetts' sometimes nosy neighbor. 
Francine Fowler (Eileen Baral) (recurring), Mrs. Fowler's daughter and classmate of Hal. Francine has a terrible crush on Hal.
Waldo, the family dog, an Old English Sheepdog

Episodes

Season 1 (1970)

Season 2 (1970–71)

Season 3 (1971)

Nanny's relatives
From time to time, some of Nanny's eccentric relatives (and some Nanny claimed as relatives because they were everybody's uncle) dropped by the Everett home for a visit. They include:

 Uncle Alfred (portrayed by John Mills, Juliet Mills's father), an eccentric who enthralls the Everett children with his wonderful stories and human flying act in his visit in "The Human Fly".
 Aunt Justine (portrayed by Ida Lupino) and Aunt Agatha (portrayed by Marjorie Bennett), two of  Nanny's loveable aunts who draw a mob of reporters, tourists and "Women's Libbers" when they descend on the Everetts, quite literally, in a balloon in "The Balloon Ladies".
 Uncle Horace (portrayed by Ray Bolger), Nanny's roguish uncle, an old charmer, just back from the South seas, finds himself in great demand as rainmaker in Nanny's drought-stricken town during his visit in "South Sea Island Sweetheart".
 Aunt Henrietta (portrayed by Elsa Lanchester), an eccentric grand dame who arrives in town with her circus and a disturbing premonition that Nanny is about to be carried off by a mustachioed stranger in "Aunt Henrietta's Premonition." She later appeared in "Aunt Henrietta and the Jinx" during a battle between reason and superstition and returned again in "Aunt Henrietta and the Poltergeist" helping to get rid of a ghost.
 Aunt Arabella, Nanny's aunt and the inspiration for the nickname of Nanny's antique 1930 Ford Model A automobile in "Nanny on Wheels".
 Nanny had a lookalike great-aunt (never seen) who lived to a ripe old age (she was born in October - a Libra).
 During Nanny's wedding to Cholmondeley Featherstonehaugh (pronounced "Chumley Fanshaw"), she found a note from her mother tucked in her great-great-great grandmother's wedding gown that told her to only marry if she was truly in love. Nanny took the advice of the note and called off the wedding.

Ratings and cancellation
The series first aired as a mid-season replacement on January 21, 1970, on ABC, and was last telecast on December 27, 1971. The series enjoyed initial success due to its Friday night timeslot when it was scheduled between The Brady Bunch and The Partridge Family, which were shows aimed at similar demographics (largely young children and pre-teens). Ratings suffered in the third season when ABC moved the series to Monday night opposite Gunsmoke and Rowan and Martin's Laugh-In. After the show was canceled, it had a brief run in syndication.  It was also one of the first shows rerun on FX Network in 1994. The show was added to getTV's lineup in May 2016 for a short time.

20th Century Fox Home Entertainment (Disney/Buena Vista) has not released the series on DVD.

References

External links
Phoebe Figalilly's bio at TV Acres
Nanny & The Professor at Hulu

Nanny & The Professor YouTube fan video

American Broadcasting Company original programming
1970s American sitcoms
1970s American college television series
1970 American television series debuts
1971 American television series endings
American fantasy television series
Fantasy comedy television series
Television duos
Television series by 20th Century Fox Television
English-language television shows
Television shows about child care occupations